Dadin Rural District is a rural district (dehestan) in Jereh and Baladeh District, Kazerun County, Fars Province, Iran. At the 2006 census, its population was 8,556, in 1,716 families.  The rural district has 30 villages.

References 

Rural Districts of Fars Province
Kazerun County